The Archonta are a now-abandoned group of mammals, considered a superorder in some classifications, which consists of these orders:
Primates
Plesiadapiformes (extinct primate-like archontans)
Scandentia (treeshrews)
Dermoptera (colugos)

While bats were traditionally included in the Archonta, recent genetic analysis has suggested that bats actually belong in Laurasiatheria. A revised category, Euarchonta, excluding bats, has been proposed.

This taxon may have arisen in the Early Cretaceous (more than 100 million years ago), so other models may explain mammalian evolution besides an explosive radiation from a single surviving lineage following the Cretaceous-Paleogene extinction of the Mesozoic megafauna, such as a series of prior radiations related to the breakup of Gondwana and Laurasia allowing for more survivors.

References 

Mammal taxonomy
Mammal superorders
Placentalia
Obsolete mammal taxa